Defonte's is a sandwich shop in the Red Hook, Brooklyn, New York City. It is known for large Italian heroes with ham, provolone, salami, roast beef, mozzarella and fried eggplant. There is also a steak pizzaiola sandwich.

History
The business began as a bodega like shop in 1922 by Nick Defonte. Before long, the longshoremen working in the area were asking for sandwiches. His grandson Nicky runs the restaurant now.  He believes the first sandwich served was ham and cheese with lettuce, tomato and olive oil.

In popular culture
The eatery was featured on Diners, Drive-Ins and Dives on February 20, 2012 in the Long Standing Legacies episode.  They were mentioned on Season 1, Episode 9 of East New York (TV series).

Locations
There is also a Gramercy location in Manhattan where offerings include prepared dinners. The original location is at 379 Columbia Street in Brooklyn.

See also
 List of restaurants in New York City
 List of Italian restaurants

References

External links
Defonte's website

Restaurants in Brooklyn
Restaurants in Manhattan
Restaurants established in 1922
Italian-American culture in New York City
Italian restaurants in New York City
Red Hook, Brooklyn
Gramercy Park